Senator Donovan may refer to:

Edward J. Donovan (1864–1908), Massachusetts State Senate
James G. Donovan (1898–1987), New York State Senate
James H. Donovan (1923–1990), New York State Senate
Jeremiah Donovan (1857–1935), Connecticut State Senate
John A. K. Donovan (1907–1993), Virginia State Senate
John J. Donovan Jr. (1913–1955), Connecticut State Senate
Kerry Donovan (fl. 2010s), Colorado State Senate
Leslie Donovan (born 1936), Kansas State Senate